The Domain Athletic Centre is an athletics facilities in Tasmania, Australia, and is located on the Queens Domain in the capital city of Hobart.  It was formerly home to the Briggs Track Classic the Tasmanian round of the Australian Athletics Tour. The stadium hosted the Australian Athletics Championships upon its opening in 1977 and is the foremost venue for athletics in Tasmania.

The centre has one major covered grandstand with all seating, changerooms, public toilets, and a kiosk. The centre features low grade lighting most suitable for evening training, but not really up to match standards. There is a carpark with 250 spaces.

It is an Olympic Standard 400 metre oval track with 10 lanes, as well as a straight section for 100 metre sprinting, and 100 metre hurdle races. It also features a steeplechase lane with waterpit, and lanes for long jump, pole vault and dedicated areas for high jump, discus and hammer throwing and the javelin.

The interior of the track is grass, and is regularly used to host football matches for both local schools and Football Federation Tasmania league Association Football (soccer) matches.

References

External links
Domain Athletic Centre on the Athletics Track Directory
Athletics South

Sports venues in Hobart
Athletics (track and field) venues in Australia
Athletics in Tasmania